Pulphead is an essay collection by the American writer and editor John Jeremiah Sullivan. Pulphead has been named a 2011 New York Times Notable Book, a Time Magazine Top 10 Nonfiction Book of 2011, and one of Amazon's Best of the Month for November 2011.

Sullivan's essay "Mr. Lytle: An Essay," which recounts his time spent living with a then geriatric Andrew Nelson Lytle, won a 2011 National Magazine Award  and a 2011 Pushcart Prize.

Original Publishing Home of Pulphead Essays

The Paris Review
 "Mister Lytle", published in Pulphead as "Mr. Lytle: An Essay"
 "Unnamed Caves", on American cave art

GQ
 "The Last Wailer", on Bunny Wailer
 "Back in the Day", on Michael Jackson, published in Pulphead as "Michael"
 "The Final Comeback of Axl Rose", on Axl Rose
 "Upon This Rock", on a visit to a Christian rock festival
 "American Grotesque", on the Tea Party movement
 "Violence of the Lambs", on the coming war between animals and humans
 "Peyton's Place", on Sullivan's house being used as a filming location for the show One Tree Hill

Harper's Magazine
 "Unknown Bards", on the history of blues music.

References

External links
 Review by James Wood in ''The New Yorker
 New York Times Review

Essay collections
2011 non-fiction books
Farrar, Straus and Giroux books